Charles Joseph Marie, 6th Duke d'Ursel (Brussels, July 3, 1848  –  Strombeek-Bever, November 15, 1903), was a Belgian politician.

Family 
Joseph, Count d'Ursel was the second son of Léon, 5th Duke d'Ursel (1805–1878) and his second wife, Henriette d'Harcourt. Joseph's elder brother died before inheriting the title, and Joseph became the 6th Duke of Ursel on the death of his father.

Antonine de Mun, Duchess d'Ursel

In 1872, Joseph married his niece, Antonine de Mun (1849–1931), daughter of the Marquess de Mun. She was a sister of Count Albert de Mun and born in Paris. In Belgium, she became a respected artist in aristocratic circles.

She studied in the atelier of Charles Joshua Chaplin and painted many portraits of family members and members of the Belgian Royal Family. A year before her death, she was honoured in her own right by the Belgian King: she was rewarded and became a Dame in the Order of Leopold. Recently, she was honoured with the production of an exclusive beer, the Cuvee Antonine, and the artworks on the bottle are of the duchess.

Children 
 Robert, 7th Duke d'Ursel (1873-1955)
 Henriette d´Ursel (1875-1934), married Count Henri de Boissieu
 Pauline d´Ursel (1880-1915)
 Wolfgang d´Ursel (1882-1914), Lieutenant of the Guides, died in battle, Budingen (18 August 1914).

Career 
He was a provincial councilor, then governor of the province of Hainaut (1878) and mayor of Hingene (1878–1903). He was Governor of Hainaut during the strikes of 1886. Impressed by these events, he became, like his brother-in-law Albert de Mun, more aware of social issues. He wrote a pamphlet in 1895, basing his ideas on Frederic Le Play.

When he reached the required age, he entered the Belgian Senate. He was the president of the Senate when he died prematurely.

Styles and honours

Styles
 1848 - 1878: Joseph, Count d´Ursel.
 1878 - 1903: His Grace the 6th Duke of Ursel and Hoboken, Prince of Arches and Charleville, Count of the Holy Roman Empire and of Grobbendonk.

Honours 
 Belgium: Grand Officer in the Order of Leopold.
 Vatican: Knight Grand Cross in the Order of Pope Pius IX.
 Spain: Knight Grand Cross in the Order of Charles III.
 France: Commander in the Legion of Honour.
 Netherlands: Knight in the Order of the Netherlands Lion.

See also
 Ursel family

References

Further reading
The late Duc d'Ursel.(2); Although Head of an Ancient House, He Was a Statesman of Progres- sive Ideas, The New York Times, 28 November 1903

1848 births
1903 deaths
19th-century Belgian politicians
Mar
Knights Grand Cross of the Order of Pope Pius IX
Recipients of the Legion of Honour
Presidents of the Senate (Belgium)
Mayors of places in Belgium